The 1995 Premier League season was the 61st season of the top tier of speedway in the United Kingdom. It was also the first for the new league, and the first of two seasons in which British speedway was competed as a single division.

Summary
The gulf in quality of teams was highlighted because of the merging of the two leagues, with Eastbourne Eagles winning the title 56 points clear of bottom club Exeter Falcons. Eastbourne had been an easy runner-up the previous year to runaway winners Poole Pirates and retained four of their riders Martin Dugard, Dean Barker, Stefan Dannö and Stefan Andersson, which provided enough firepower to seal the Championship. Poole finished mid-table but were missing Craig Boyce who had switched to Swindon Robins.

Bradford Dukes won their fourth Knockout Cup in the last five years. Former World Champion Gary Havelock guided Bradford to the Cup success and also picked up the Premier League Riders Championship.

Final table
M = Matches; W = Wins; D = Draws; L = Losses; Pts = Total Points

Premier League Knockout Cup
The 1995 Speedway Star Knockout Cup was the 57th edition of the Knockout Cup for tier one teams but the first to be known as the Premier League Knockout Cup. Bradford Dukes were the winners of the competition.

First round

Second round

Quarter-finals

Semi-finals

Final

First leg

Second leg

Bradford Dukes were declared Knockout Cup Champions, winning on aggregate 111-97.

Leading final averages

Riders & final averages
Arena Essex

 9.96
 8.09
 7.45
 6.20
 6.08
 5.82
 5.11
 4.68
 2.69

Belle Vue

 9.06
 8.35
 7.86
 7.75
 5.92
 4.71
 4.69
 2.74
 3.50
 3.20

Bradford

 10.82 
 10.25 
 8.12
 6.86
 5.40
 3.90
 3.76
 3.33

Coventry

 9.53
 8.56
 6.68
 6.51
 5.49
 5.31
 4.05

Cradley Heath

 10.91
 10.42
 9.01
 5.44
 5.17
 4.08
 2.01
 1.24

Eastbourne

 10.22
 9.35 
 8.71
 7.80
 4.68
 4.42
 3.75

Edinburgh

 8.26
 6.87
 6.78
 6.75
 6.69
 6.40
 5.59
 3.54

Exeter

 9.78 
 6.56
 6.00
 5.62
 5.42
 4.67
 4.04
 2.13

Glasgow

 8.53
 8.48
 7.11
 6.34
 6.26
 5.60
 5.43

Hull

 8.97 
 8.20
 7.15
 7.04
 4.68
 4.35
 3.59
 1.00
 0.71

Ipswich

 10.52
 8.26 
 7.34
 6.01
 5.99
 5.75
 4.22

King's Lynn

 8.98 
 8.75
 8.18
 6.92
 5.43
 3.82
 3.50
 3.16
 2.15

Long Eaton

Jan Stæchmann 10.10
 8.84
 7.61
 7.22
 6.81
 5.45
 5.13
 4.58
 4.00
 3.06

Middlesbrough

 8.54
 6.55
 6.18
 5.94
 5.67
 4.69
 3.73
 2.26

Oxford

 8.36
 7.72
 7.55
 5.93
 5.79
 4.81
 4.81

Peterborough

 8.85
 8.38
 8.15
 6.53
 6.12
 5.11
 4.97

Poole

 10.44 
 9.94 
 8.26
 6.83
 3.83
 3.35
 3.01
 2.06

Reading

 9.44
 8.90
 8.31
 7.74
 7.01
 5.97
 5.02
 3.00
 1.29

Sheffield

 7.31
 7.23
 6.91
 6.84
 6.82
 5.91
 2.93
 2.50

Swindon

 8.66
 8.36
 7.92
 6.12
 5.59
 4.49
 2.63
 1.38

Wolverhampton

 10.50
 10.37
 5.94
 5.61
 5.10
 4.99
 4.00
 2.71
 2.09

See also
 List of United Kingdom Speedway League Champions
 Knockout Cup (speedway)

References

Speedway Premier League
1995 in speedway
1995 in British motorsport